Turowice may refer to the following places:
Turowice, Grójec County in Masovian Voivodeship (east-central Poland)
Turowice, Piaseczno County in Masovian Voivodeship (east-central Poland)
Turowice, Świętokrzyskie Voivodeship (south-central Poland)